The Men's decathlon at the 2011 All-Africa Games took place between September 11 and 12, at the Estádio Nacional do Zimpeto.

Medalists

Records 
Prior to this competition, the existing World, African record and World leading were as follows:

Results

(NR - National Record, PB - Person Best, SB - Season Best, = - Equaled)

100m
11 September 2011 - 12:21
Wind: 0.0 m/s

Long Jump
11 September 2011

Shot Put
11 September 2011

High Jump

11 September 2011

400m
11 September 2011

110m Hurdles
12 September 2011

Discus Throw 
12 September 2011

Pole Vault
12 September 2011

Javelin Throw
12 September 2011

1500m
12 September 2011

Final standings
Standings after Event 1012 September 2011Legend:W = Wind m/s, M = Mark, P = Points

References

Specific

Decathlon